El Salvador became the first country in the world to use Bitcoin as legal tender, after having been adopted as such by the Legislative Assembly of El Salvador in 2021. It has been promoted by Nayib Bukele, the president of El Salvador, who claimed that it would improve the economy by making banking easier for Salvadorans, and that it would encourage foreign investment. The adoption has been criticized both internationally and within El Salvador, due to the volatility of Bitcoin, its environmental impact, and lack of transparency regarding the government's fiscal policy.

History

Background 

The colón (SVC) was the official currency of El Salvador from 1892  until it was replaced by the US dollar on January 1, 2001, when the Legislative Assembly of El Salvador passed the Monetary Integration Act under the administration of former President Francisco Flores. The Act authorized the free circulation of the United States dollar in El Salvador, and removed the colón from circulation. The purpose of dollarizing El Salvador was to achieve financial stability by encouraging foreign investment and decreasing transaction costs of international trade.

However, the government was unable to control monetary policy after dollarization, as the value of currency was tied to the United States Federal Reserve. The exchange rate, which was fixed at one U.S dollar being equivalent to 8.75 colóns, decreased the purchasing power of the population. Dollarization slowed down El Salvador's exports because it could not compete against the undervalued currencies of other developing countries such as China. The lack of financial literacy harmed the population of El Salvador since they did not know how to use the US dollar, nor did they understand its value.

Remittances accounted for 23% of GDP in 2020. They are currently delivered by money transmitters, which operate on an in-person basis.

In 2019, the village of El Zonte adopted bitcoin as a payment following a donation of $100,000 worth of bitcoin from an anonymous donor. The donation came with the stipulation that the village adopt a circular economy based on bitcoin. Many residents in El Zonte did not have access to banking services, and accessed bitcoin through mobile devices and Bitcoin ATMs in commercial areas. The village has since become known as "Bitcoin Beach", and has been cited as an example of using cryptocurrency as legal tender by advocates of bitcoin. As of 2022, Honduras and Guatemala had also made attempts to attract tourists through the use of bitcoin in "bitcoin hubs."

Adoption 
On June 5, 2021 President of El Salvador Nayib Bukele announced a bill to adopt bitcoin as legal tender in El Salvador, via an English-language video at Bitcoin Conference 2021 in Miami. Bukele claimed that the adoption of Bitcoin would make it easier for Salvadorans living abroad to send remittances to their relatives in the country. The use of bitcoin would also make digital transactions more accessible to underbanked people.

On June 9, 2021, the Legislative Assembly of El Salvador voted to adopt the Bitcoin Law, that would make the cryptocurrency legal tender in the country, with a majority vote of 62 of the 84 deputies in favor. The government announced that it had set aside $150 million in cash to back the country's bitcoin. The World Bank rejected a request from the government to assist with the implementation of the law due to transparency concerns and the environmental impact of bitcoin mining. The government announced that it would distribute  in bitcoin to people who sign up to use an electronic wallet called Chivo (Salvadorean slang for 'cool'), at a cost of up to $75 million. Chivo is run by a private enterprise, but information regarding the platform and its policies are classified by the government.

Reaction 
The adoption of bitcoin as legal tender in El Salvador drew criticism both internationally, and within El Salvador. On September 7, thousands of protestors gathered in San Salvador to protest the launch of Chivo and the adoption of bitcoin. The cause of these protests was concern over a lack of transparency regarding the creation of the Bitcoin Law and Chivo, and the use of tax dollars to purchase bitcoin. The limited rate of internet penetration in El Salvador would also limit the number of people who could make use of cryptocurrency.

Many international financial experts warned that bitcoin's volatility would introduce unnecessary risk and instability to El Salvador's underdeveloped economy. In July 2021, Moody's Investors Service downgraded the credit rating of El Salvador, citing Bukele's fiscal policies and the adoption of bitcoin as a factor. The day following El Salvador's adoption of bitcoin, Panamanian congressman Gabriel Silva proposed a similar bill that would give "legal, regulatory, and fiscal certainty to the use, holding and issuance of digital value and crypto assets in the Republic of Panama."

Some critics suggested that bitcoin's anonymity would make it easier to engage in money laundering and criminal activities. In particular, the potential use of Bitcoin to evade taxes, and in transactions related to transnational gangs and human trafficking in El Salvador was noted.

The international cryptocurrency community was largely supportive of the law, which they believed could lead to a greater acceptance of cryptocurrency by states and central banks. Cryptocurrency advocates on Twitter and Instagram shared videos of people using bitcoin to make purchases at chains like Starbucks, Pizza Hut and McDonald's.

In January 2022, the International Monetary Fund urged El Salvador to cease using bitcoin as legal tender, citing its risk to the country's financial stability, integrity and consumer protection. The IMF advised that the continued use of bitcoin would make it less likely that the institution would grant El Salvador a previously discussed loan of $1.3 billion.

A poll by the Centro de Estudios Ciudadanos at Francisco Gavidia University in November 2021, found that 91% of Salvadorans preferred to use the US dollar over Bitcoin. In January 2022, Fortune reported that the switch to bitcoin had made paying remittances more difficult for many Salvadorans, rather than easier as had been promised, because the fees associated with the bitcoin transactions were several times as expensive as traditional remittances.

A poll published by the Central American University in September 2021 found that 9 out of 10 of Salvadorans did not have a clear understanding of what bitcoin was, and 67.9% disagreed with the decision to adopt it as legal tender. The government of El Salvador purchased ₿400, worth about $20.9 million at the time, on September 6, the day before the Bitcoin Law came into effect. On September 7, 2021, the Bitcoin Law came into effect and bitcoin became legal tender in El Salvador, making it the first country in the world to do so. As part of this adoption, the government began requiring all businesses to accept it. Under the law, transactions in bitcoin are not subject to capital gains tax, and foreign bitcoin investors who invest over ₿3 in the country are eligible for permanent residence.

Usage of and economic impact of bitcoin in El Salvador

Immediate impact in 2021 

Chivo launched in October 2021, and immediately drew criticism for issues regarding features like payment processing and transactions. Shortly after midnight, Bukele confirmed via Twitter that the app was not available through either the Apple Store or Huawei, although the latter later added it. Chivo was disabled a few hours after launch to allow the platform to increase the capacity of its servers. The system was also plagued by identity theft, which resulted in the theft of sign-on bonuses. Shortly after launch, Chivo announced that it was changing its pricing features to prevent scalping, which led to further complaints over the difficulty of day trading on Chivo and pricing discrepancies.

The majority of users stopped using the platform after they had collected their sign on bonuses. According to Financial Times, one of the country's largest banks reported that during the first week of Chivo's under 0.0001% of its transactions were in bitcoin.

In 2021, the government of El Salvador began purchasing bitcoin. It spent about $85.5 million on bitcoin between September 2021 and January 2022. The value of bitcoin began decreasing in November 2021, and had fallen by about 45% of its value by January 2022. It is estimated that the El Salvadoran national reserves had lost $22 million as a result of this. The government continued to purchase bitcoins during this dip, and had holdings of at least ₿1,801 valued at $66 million as of January 2022.

Bukele announced that the government would use sustainable geothermal energy for Bitcoin mining. Bitcoin mining uses large amounts of energy, which contributes to pollution if fossil fuels are used to provide that energy. Bukele announced plans for a "Bitcoin City" in November 2021. The city would be built at the base of Conchagua volcano and would be circular, evoking the shape of a coin. The city's location would enable it to use geothermal energy for bitcoin mining. Bukele additionally stated that income taxes would not be collected in the city.

El Salvador's overseas bonds dropped. In 2022, the government began drafting legislature for the creation of $1 billion in "Volcano Bonds". Half of these bonds would be used to fund Bukele's "Bitcoin City", while the remaining half would be used to purchase bitcoin that would have a five-year lock up period. The announcement caused the value of El Salvador's overseas bonds to decrease, falling by 30% in December 2021.

Usage in 2022 
A year after the adoption of bitcoin, economic surveys found that cryptocurrency was not widely used in El Salvador, due in part to a lack of digital literacy. A study published by the US National Bureau of Economic Research found that 20% of people who downloaded the Chivo app did not use their $30 sign-on bonus, and 61% of Chivo users stopped using the app after spending their bonus. Despite governmental attempts to make bitcoin acceptance universal, only an estimated 20% of business accepted payment in bitcoin. The Salvadoran Chamber of Commerce found that only 14% of businesses in El Salvador had conducted bitcoin transactions between September 2021 and July 2022, and 3% felt that being able to use bitcoin was valuable. According to the Central Reserve Bank, bitcoin was used in 1.9% of remittance payments sent to El Salvador between September 2021 and April 2022. Media outlets reported that bitcoin had failed to increase tourist revenue, and that its use even in tourist hubs was limited to a minority of tourists. However, some businesses in El Zonte reported that they had seen a 30% increase in business from cryptocurrency tourists.

In March 2022, the Salvadoran government announced that the "Volcano Bonds" project had been postponed, citing global economic conditions and the war in Ukraine as factors.

After the 2021–2022 cryptocurrency crash, bitcoin lost 70% of the value it had in November 2021. By this time, Bukele spent about US$150 million, or roughly 4% of El Salvador's national reserves, to invest in Bitcoin. According to BBC, the 2,300 bitcoins purchased by the Salvadoran government had lost 50% of their value. El Salvador's economic growth rate declined during this time, and many economists predicted it had a high chance of defaulting on its debt. In response to these issues, Bukele decreased public funding, which resulted in the reduction of water infrastructure and public services in some municipalities. Bukele frequently responded to volatility in the cryptocurrency market by announcing on Twitter that he was "buying the dip." In June 2022, he bought an additional 80 bitcoins. The Salvadoran Minister of Finance Alejandro Zelaya stated that the country had not lost any money during the crash, because it did not sell any of its bitcoins.

Prior to the crash, several other countries had announced plans to adopt bitcoin as legal tender, but only the Central African Republic has done so.

See also 

 Legality of bitcoin by country or territory

References

Currencies of El Salvador
El Salvador
Nayib Bukele